Praba Malkanthi Udawatte (born 4 October 1980 in Kandy, Sri Lanka) is a Sri Lankan cricketer. She was a right-handed batsman as well as a right-arm medium-fast bowler.

References

1980 births
Living people
Sri Lankan women cricketers
Sri Lanka women One Day International cricketers
People from Kandy